Bunker Spreckels (born Adolph Bernard Spreckels III; August 15, 1949 – January 7, 1977) was an American surfer and an early pioneer of a surfboard design.

He was the great-grandson of German-born sugar baron Claus Spreckels.

He was heir to the Spreckels Sugar fortune, and when his mother married the actor Clark Gable, Spreckels became Gable's stepson.

Bunker, as he was known by his family, met surf photographer Art Brewer in 1969 at the surf spot known as Banzai Pipeline whilst Brewer was on a three-month photo shoot for Surfer magazine.

Early life 
Spreckels was born in Los Angeles County, California.  His mother was Kay Spreckels (née Kathleen Williams), a three-times-married former fashion model and actress; his father was sugar-refining heir Adolph Bernard Spreckels Jr.    Clark Gable was his stepfather, and his great-grandfather was Claus Spreckels, who came to America from Germany as Claus von Spreckelson.

Family connections (Hawaii) 

Bunker enjoyed a wide range of connections ranging from the highest echelons of Hawaiian society to the worlds of surfing, swimming and acting.
 
His great-grandfather Claus became a close friend and confidant of the last reigning king of Hawaii, David Kalakaua. After arriving in Hawaii in the late 1800s, Claus visited King David, sometimes known as the Merrie Monarch, who owed large debts to various people. Claus paid the debts and in return was given land that he used for sugar plantations. His support of Kalakaua was immensely beneficial and the addition of his Hawaiian enterprise made Spreckels a multi-millionaire, with a fortune estimated at $12 to $25 million in the late 1880s.

Bunker’s mother Kay was the fifth wife of Hollywood legend Clark Gable who, after marrying Kay in 1955, became Bunker’s stepfather. Gable was held in high esteem in Hawaii due to his close friendship with Duke Kahanamoku, the figure generally revered by the surf community as the father of modern surfing. Duke, amongst other roles, spent time as an actor following a successful period as an Olympic swimmer and competed against another Olympian turned actor, Johnny Weissmuller, in the 1924 Olympics in Paris. Weissmuller himself achieved Hollywood fame as the lead in multiple Tarzan films.

Early life in Hawaii 

His family's Hawaiian connections endeared Bunker to the local community. The beach boys of Waikiki became his mentors and introduced him to Oahu's North Shore. This mentoring was rare as Bunker was white with blonde hair and blue eyes which in Hawaii classified him as a haole, meaning, in its simplest term, a foreigner, aloof and ignorant of local ways.

Many non-Hawaiians who moved to the islands in the 1960s during the surfing boom fell foul of this classification and suffered violence from the local surfers for their apparent lack of respect. Australian surfer Wayne "Rabbit" Bartholomew describes such events vividly in his book Bustin’ Down the Door, including an episode where he was attacked and lost some of his teeth.

During this time Bunker eschewed his family fortune preferring a simple life, away from the glare of publicity. He survived by building surfboards and eating the fruit that grew freely on the North Shore of Oahu. C. R. Stecyk states Bunker pioneered a “revolutionary approach to board design and wave riding that has never been equalled. Bunker crafted radically short, hard edged boards that he rode lying down, on his knees, and standing up, oftentimes changing to the most effective body position several times during a single ride.”

In 1970 Bunker was riding a board which became known as the Bunker board. It was this board that it is believed to have evolved into the style that is now known as the fish, although the fish incorporates a combination of many different styles.

Later years 

Once Bunker inherited his family fortune on his 21st birthday, the simple life ended. Like his father before him (whom Bunker estimated spent in the region of $50m) Bunker enjoyed the freedom it gave him to do things he hadn’t been able to do before, including travel. It also led to him developing an expensive drug habit – which is believed to have led eventually to his death.

A lifestyle of excess is described by Art Brewer who, in 1974, travelled with Bunker to Los Angeles, London, South Africa and Paris “to surf and to photograph their experiences”. He explains the rule of the trip as being very simple: “If I was fired I’d receive a first class return ticket home; if I quit, I was on my own. No salary but all expenses paid.” The trip itself he describes simply as “pure 24/7 crazy shit. Anything could happen and did.”

Death

It was two years later, while Brewer and Craig Stecyk were talking to Rolling Stone magazine about writing and shooting a story about Bunker, that the news came through that Bunker had died on January 7, 1977, at the age of 27, at a friend’s house on the North Shore. The cause of death was reportedly a morphine overdose.

He was interred at Forest Lawn Memorial Park in Glendale, California.

References

External links
 Carve Magazine article with pictures

American surfers
1949 births
1977 deaths
People from Los Angeles County, California
Burials at Forest Lawn Memorial Park (Glendale)
Drug-related deaths in Hawaii